Crystal Lane-Wright (née Lane; born 13 September 1985) is a British Paralympic track and road cyclist competing in C5 events. A bronze medallist in the Road World Championships in 2011, she competed for Great Britain team at the 2012 Summer Paralympics and 2016 Summer Paralympics. At the 2016 Games in Rio she took silver medal in the individual pursuit and bronze in the road race. In 2018, she won the individual pursuit at the Rio de Janeiro Track World Championships. The same year she also took silver in individual time trial and bronze in the road race in the Road World Championships held in Maniago.

Personal history
Lane-Wright was born with an under-developed left arm and took up sport as a youth and was active in football, playing at county level. In 2008, she watched Sarah Storey compete at the 2008 Summer Paralympics in Beijing. She noticed that she had a similar disability to Storey and realised that she could classify as a Paralympic athlete. After a 2009 Great Britain campaign to find athletes for the 2012 Summer Paralympics, Lane-Wright applied and was accepted for trials. By December 2010 she was part of a three athletes selected as part of the GB Para-Cycling Team for 2011.

Lane-Wright made her international debut in 2011 competing in the Road World Championships in Roskilde, Denmark. She finished 9th in the C5 Time Trial and took the bronze medal in the C5 road race, the gold going to GB team mate Sarah Storey. In 2012 Lane-Wright entered the UCI World Cup in Rome. There she finished 4th in the Road Race and 5th in the Time Trial. Lane-Wright qualified for the 2012 Summer Paralympics in all three of her specialised events, C5 track pursuit, C5 time trial and C4-5 road race.

Lane-Wright was part of the UK cycling team at the postponed 2020 Summer Paralympics.

Outside cycling Lane-Wright was a student Loughborough University, studying for an MSc in Sport Nutrition. Crystal graduated from the University of Exeter with a 2:1 in Exercise and Sports Science in 2011.

References

External links
 

1985 births
Living people
English track cyclists
English female cyclists
Paralympic cyclists of Great Britain
Sportspeople from Chelmsford
Cyclists at the 2012 Summer Paralympics
Alumni of Loughborough University
Cyclists at the 2016 Summer Paralympics
Medalists at the 2016 Summer Paralympics
Cyclists at the 2020 Summer Paralympics
Medalists at the 2020 Summer Paralympics
Paralympic silver medalists for Great Britain
Paralympic bronze medalists for Great Britain
Paralympic medalists in cycling